Alexander Dowie (4 September 1827 – 18 July 1909) was an 1851 emigrant from Scotland to South Australia. He is known as a businessman, who developed a major footwear manufacturing, tannery, and retailer in Adelaide.

Early life and education
Alexander Dowie was born in 1828 as the third son of John Dowie (26 November 1800 – c. 1832) and his wife Margaret (born 1 August 1802). His family included a younger brother, John Murray Dowie. His father and sister died when Alexander was around four years old. Later the boy lived in Portobello, Scotland, where he was apprenticed to learn the trade of bootmaker.

Marriage and emigration to South Australia
In April 1851 Dowie married Jane Cockburn (c. 1831 – 28 October 1910) and they emigrated to South Australia on the Blundell in May that year, partly sponsored by Caroline Chisholm. They arrived at Adelaide in August. He joined the gold rush to Mount Alexander, but soon returned to Adelaide, opening a bootmaker's shop and factory ("South Australian Boot Factory") in Rundle Street. He had his businesses in buildings at the far end of the street, then moved closer to the center, at numbers 69 and then 63. He also opened a tannery in Bowden.

In 1904 Dowie transferred his business to sons Norman and (Charles) Stuart; they sold it to A. W. Barlow and Co. in 1908.

His brother John Murray Dowie had followed him from Scotland to South Australia, immigrating there in 1860. His son John Alexander Dowie worked for a time in his uncle's bootmaking business. After studying theology in Edinburgh, the younger John A. Dowie returned to Australia and started serving as a minister. He married Dowie's daughter Jane. They had a family. After serving as a conventional minister, JA Dowie built a huge following for his faith healing ministry. He immigrated with his family in 1888 to San Francisco, California in the United States. By 1893 he settled in Chicago (in time for the World's Fair that year). After building his faith healing business, in 1901 he bought land and founded Zion City in Illinois, about 40 miles north of the city. He owned all the property.

Alexander was a friend of John Darling, and influenced him to also emigrate to South Australia. They continued to associate: Darling hired at least one of the Dowie boys, the two families worshipped at the same church, and two Darling boys married daughters of Dowie.

Dowie was appointed President of the Board of Conciliation, serving from 1885 to 1896.

Religion
He joined the Congregational Church before he left Scotland, and was active in the Adelaide church as Sunday-school teacher, lay preacher, and deacon.

Family
Alexander Dowie died 18 July 1909. His wife, Jane Dowie, died 28 October 1910
John Alexander Dowie (died 9 April 1888) married Jessie Blair Crawford (1862–1921). She was a sister of R. H. Crawford.) on 12 April 1883
Jessie Dowie (1852 – 23 November 1915) married John Darling, jun. (1852–1914) on 14 October 1875.
Jane Dowie (9 May 1854 – 11 March 1936 in Zion City, Ill.) married her cousin Rev. John Alexander Dowie ("Elijah" to his followers) on 26 May 1876. As "Overseer Jane Dowie" she held high office in his church.
Margaret "Maggie" Dowie (1856 – 1920) married Arthur Faulkner Gardiner (died 20 April 1936) (son of Robert Gardiner) on 28 May 1875
Mary Dowie (21 September 1860 – ) married S Stevenson in Chicago, Ill. on 25 July 1900
Bessie Dowie (24 September 1862 – c. 1890) married James Darling on 26 October 1882; moved to "Glenarona", Kilmore, Victoria 
Adelaide Dowie (4 December 1864 – 12 July 1892)
George Cockburn Dowie (18 October 1867 – 16 November 1886)
Norman Dowie (27 July 1870 – 14 September 1947) worked in father's business
(Charles) Stuart Dowie (10 April 1874 – 17 November 1937) worked in his father's business. He married Gertrude Phillis (Phyllis?) Davey on 21 December 1910. A son was the famous sculptor John Dowie.

His brother John Murray Dowie (c. 1826 – c. October 1908) emigrated c. 1861 aboard Shah Jehan; active Hindmarsh Square Congregational Church, left for Chicago 1896
Andrew Dowie ( – 16 March 1919) educated at AEI, married Honor Ann Uren ( – 1917) in 1876
John Alexander Dowie "Elijah Dowie" married his cousin, Jane Dowie (9 May 1854 – 11 March 1936) on 26 May 1876. Not to be confused with his identically named cousin (above).
Gladstone Dowie (1877–1945)
Jeanie Dowie (1879–1885)
Esther Dowie (1881–1902).

References 

1827 births
1909 deaths
Companies based in Adelaide
19th-century Australian businesspeople